A Friend So Lovely as You is an operetta by Will Meisel to a libretto by Willy Rosen and Marcel Lion. The same year, it was turned into a film with Anny Ondra, Felix Bressart and Adele Sandrock, directed by Carl Lamac; the title song was performed by Zarah Leander.

References

Bibliography
 Grange, William. Cultural Chronicle of the Weimar Republic. Scarecrow Press, 2008.

Operas by Will Meisel
1930 operas
German-language operettas
Operas